Welliton de Moraes Coimbra, known as Tozin or Tozim (born 10 November 1984), is a Brazilian professional footballer who plays for Interporto. He has played abroad in China, Japan and Saudi Arabia.

Career
Tozin spent his early career on loan from Gurupi to various clubs competing in  Brazilian state football. In July 2007 he signed a 1-year deal with Legião. The team finished as the runner-up of Campeonato Brasiliense Second Division. In May 2008 he was signed by Corinthians Alagoano on a three-year contract and left for fellow Alagoas club CRB on loan. His loan was ended early on 29 October, a few weeks before the end of 2008 Campeonato Brasileiro Série B.

In February 2009 he moved on loan to J2 League club Sagan Tosu. Tozin returned to Maceió in January 2010. Corinthians Alagoano finished as the losing semi-finalists of 2010 Campeonato Alagoano. In May he left on loan again to Guaratinguetá and made a few appearances in 2010 Campeonato Brasileiro Série B. In September he had a further loan spell with Metropolitano in 2010 Campeonato Brasileiro Série D.

Tozin's contract with Corinthians Alagoano was extended to in January 2011 for a further two years, and he moved to Chinese Super League side Nanchang Hengyuan on a one-year loan deal. However, he returned to Corinthians Alagoano in March without playing a match in China. He was immediately loaned again to Cuiabá.

In January 2012, Tozin joined J1 League side Sagan Tosu on a one-year loan deal.

Tozin was loaned to Luverdense for 2013, but was released for disciplinary reasons by the club in October, despite being top scorer in 2013 Campeonato Brasileiro Série C at the time. Later in the year it was announced that he would join CRB on loan for the 2014 season. After two appearances in 2014 Campeonato Brasileiro Série C he moved to Metropolitano for a second loan spell, competing in Série D.

Tozin spent 2015 on loan with Aparecidense and Luverdense, where he scored 13 goals in 2015 Campeonato Brasileiro Série B. He was announced as a signing for Aparecidense for the 2016 season, but instead moved to Saudi Arabia, joining Najran SC. He returned to Brazil, for a third spellwith Luverdense, in June 2016.

Tozin joined Aparecidense again in 2017, featuring firstly in the Campeonato Goiano, where he notably scored a volley from a corner kick in the first game of the competition, a feat he was invited by Globo Esporte to reproduce in front of the cameras. He went on to feature in all eight of the clubs 2017 Campeonato Brasileiro Série D matches. At the end of the campaign he joined Parauapebas for the remainder of the Campeonato Paraense Second Division season, but was released before the final took place.

Tozin signed for Treze for the 2018 Campeonato Paraibano season. He left midway through the championship, joining Gurupi to play in the Campeonato Tocantinense where he was top scorer with 13 goals. At the end of that competition he signed for CRAC in the second division of Campeonato Goiano, where he made just two appearances. By late September he had moved on again, to Sport Club Guaraí who were engaged in the second division of the Campeonato Tocantinense.

Tozin started 2019 with Palmas for the 2019 Campeonato Tocantinense and 2019 Campeonato Brasileiro Série D. in June, with Palmas knocked out of Série D he signed for a fourth spell with Luverdense, playing in 2018 Campeonato Brasileiro Série C. In November he joined Capital Futebol Clube in the second division of Campeonato Tocantinense, where he helped the team to win the title.

On 20 January 2020, Tozin signed for Interporto Futebol Clube for the 2020 Campeonato Tocantinense.

Career statistics

References

External links
 
 
 Tozin at ZeroZero

1984 births
Living people
Brazilian footballers
Sport Club Corinthians Alagoano players
Centro Sportivo Alagoano players
Clube de Regatas Brasil players
Sagan Tosu players
Guaratinguetá Futebol players
Clube Atlético Metropolitano players
Shanghai Shenxin F.C. players
Cuiabá Esporte Clube players
Luverdense Esporte Clube players
América Futebol Clube (SP) players
Guarani FC players
Legião Futebol Clube players
Treze Futebol Clube players
Gurupi Esporte Clube players
Clube Recreativo e Atlético Catalano players
Palmas Futebol e Regatas players
Interporto Futebol Clube players
Sport Club Guaraí players
Parauapebas Futebol Clube players
Associação Atlética Aparecidense players
J1 League players
J2 League players
Brazilian expatriate footballers
Expatriate footballers in Japan
Expatriate footballers in China
Brazilian expatriate sportspeople in Japan
Brazilian expatriate sportspeople in China
Association football forwards
Tocantinópolis Esporte Clube players
Najran SC players
Saudi Professional League players
Campeonato Brasileiro Série B players
Campeonato Brasileiro Série C players
Campeonato Brasileiro Série D players
Sportspeople from Tocantins